Keene Township may refer to:

 Keene Township, Adams County, Illinois
 Keene Township, Michigan
 Keene Township, Clay County, Minnesota
 Keene Township, McKenzie County, North Dakota, in McKenzie County, North Dakota
 Keene Township, Coshocton County, Ohio

Township name disambiguation pages